Ravalli County Airport  is a public use airport in Ravalli County, Montana, United States. It is owned by Ravalli County and located one nautical mile (2 km) east of the central business district of Hamilton, Montana. This airport is included in the National Plan of Integrated Airport Systems for 2011–2015, which categorized it as a general aviation facility.

Facilities and aircraft 
Ravalli County Airport covers an area of 439 acres (178 ha) at an elevation of 3,636 feet (1,108 m) above mean sea level. It has two asphalt runways: 16/34 measuring 4,200 by 75 feet (1,280 x 23 m), and 17/35 measuring 5,200 by 75 feet (1,585 x 23 m).

For the 12-month period ending September 18, 2009, the airport had 23,600 aircraft operations, an average of 64 per day: 92% general aviation and 8% air taxi. At that time there were 90 aircraft based at this airport: 80% single-engine, 6% multi-engine, 5.6% glider, 3% helicopter, 3% ultralight, and 2% jet.

Choice Aviation, the airport's fixed-base operator (FBO), offer fuel, flight instruction, aircraft/hangar rental, and other services including backcountry flights into the Selway Wilderness areas.

406 Airframes Inc. provides aircraft structural repair and modifications.

See also 
 List of airports in Montana

References

External links 
 Airport page at Ravalli County website
 Choice Aviation, the fixed-base operator (FBO)
 Aerial image as of July 1995 from USGS The National Map
 
 

Airports in Montana
Transportation in Ravalli County, Montana
Buildings and structures in Ravalli County, Montana
Hamilton, Montana